The plateau chub (Evarra eigenmanni) is an extinct species of ray-finned fish in the family Cyprinidae.
It was found only in Mexico.

References 

Evarra
Fish described in 1894
Fish of North America becoming extinct since 1500
Endemic fish of Mexico
Freshwater fish of Mexico
Taxonomy articles created by Polbot